The MNDF Marine Corps are a frontline ground combat force of the Maldives National Defence Force, formed in 2006. The Marine Corps (formerly known as Rapid Reaction Force) were established at various strategic locations and vulnerable areas to enhance the force projection to provide their services throughout the country. It is a lethal and a mobile force, with a high physical strength and combat capability.

History 
The former infantry oriented rapid reaction force was transformed into the Marine Corps under the new direction considering the archipelagic and maritime nature of the country and to that effect having felt the need to incorporate marine tactics into the force which largely cater for amphibious and rapid deployment capabilities.  Marines Corps is trained and equipped to project its combat power through sea by its inherent rapid deployable capabilities and to fight in all types of weather and terrain in the country including urban terrain.

Structure 

It is structured into Marine Deployment Units (MDUs) which is centered on an infantry organization and acts as force projection elements of the MNDF by closely working with the Coast Guard.  MDUs are currently being deployed in all the Area Commands of the MNDF. Some of these MDUs have armored detachments consisting of armored personnel carriers and infantry fighting vehicles which provide armor protection and mobility to ground combat troops.

The Marine Corps is headed by the Commandant of the Marine Corps who holds the rank of a Brigadier General. The Commandant is responsible for administration, readiness, training and discipline of the force. Hence, he formulates policy on these aspects in consultation with the Chief of Defence Force and the Vice Chief of Defence Force and with the civil leadership. The Commandant does not have the operational command authority over the Marine Corps. The administrative duties of the force such as organizing, equipping, posting, assigning and so forth are discharged through the Principal Director of the Marine Corps.

Task 
The primary task of the Marine Corps is to protect the land territory of the country by defending the critical infrastructure and the key state installations of the state and importantly acting as a standby force to react on ‘Be Prepared Missions’. In addition to their Key Point Defence roles, the major offensive operational tasks of the Marine Corps during a hostile situation will be to perform zone reconnaissance, to undertake amphibious assaults, to secure beach-heads, to exploit breakthroughs and conduct close quarter combat and other combined arms operations. Thus, the MNDF marines undergo an annual cycle of rigorous infantry oriented training which is generally of amphibious nature. As a result, a normal day for a marine comprises intense physical training, training on Marine Corps tactics, techniques, procedures and soldierly skills. Apparently, the ultimate focus of the Marine Corps training is to provide a cohesive combat efficient team that is tactically sound and highly maneuverable on Maldivian terrain with high stamina and physical agility.

Functions 
The Marine Corps is composed of Marine Deployment Units (MDUs). They are deployed for the purpose of maintaining security in their key areas of responsibility and their operational conduct involves;
 Assistance to Coast Guard in maritime operations.
 Assistance to Civil Authorities at times of crisis.
 Search and Rescue operations.
 Providing Key Point guards.
Undertaking combat operations.
 Conducting counter insurgency.
Carrying out counter terrorism operations.
The Marine Corps is often assigned on non-combat missions such as providing humanitarian assistance and disaster relief operations.

References

 

Law enforcement in the Maldives
Military of the Maldives
Military units and formations established in 2008